The Ashry Cup also called "Abdul Azim Ashry Cup" (Arabic: كأس عبد العظيم عشري) was official competition it was played for the 2 times in Egypt 1998 and 2000, but it was cancelled in 2000 due to the intention of FIBA Africa

Finals

References 

 Africa: Five Teams for African Basketball Tourney
 Nigeria: Comets Bid To Host Continental Tourney
 Africa: Ebun Comets Walk Over ABC
 

Basketball club competitions in Africa
International club basketball competitions